Yllymakh is a rural locality (a selo), one of five settlements, in addition to Tommot, the administrative centre of the settlement, the Urban-type settlement of Bezymyanny, and the villages of Ulu and Verkhnyaya Amga in the Town of Tommot of Aldansky District in the Sakha Republic, Russia. Its population as of the 2010 Census was 472; down from 500 recorded in the 2002 Census.

References

Notes

Sources
Official website of the Sakha Republic. Registry of the Administrative-Territorial Divisions of the Sakha Republic. Aldansky District. 

Rural localities in Aldansky District